"One in a Million is a song by American rock band Trixter. Written by guitarist Steve Brown with Bill and Jim Wray, the song was released as the second single from the band's self-titled debut.

While not as successful as previous single "Give It to Me Good", "One in a Million" was still a modest success, peaking at #75 and #33 on the Billboard Hot 100 and Mainstream Rock charts, respectively.

Track listing
CD single

"Hit Radio Edit" single

Charts

Personnel
 Peter "Pete" Loran – lead vocals
 Steve Brown – lead guitar, backing vocals
 P.J. Farley – bass guitar, backing vocals
 Mark "Gus" Scott – drums, backing vocals

References

External links
 Official Music Video at YouTube

1990 songs
1991 singles
MCA Records singles
Songs written by Bill Wray (composer)